The Jakarta Mass Rapid Transit ( Jakarta) or Jakarta MRT (stylized as mrt jakarta) is a rapid transit system in Jakarta, the capital city of Indonesia.

The system is operated by PT Mass Rapid Transit Jakarta (Perseroda), a municipally owned perseroan terbatas of the city of Jakarta. Phase 1 of the project (Lebak Bulus to Bundaran HI) was officially opened on 24 March 2019.

Background 
Jakarta is the capital city of Indonesia, harbouring 10 million inhabitants, one-third of the population of Greater Jakarta. It is estimated that over four million residents of the surrounding Greater Jakarta area commute to and from the city each working day. Transport issues have increasingly begun to attract political attention and it has been foreseen that without a major transportation breakthrough, the city will have complete traffic gridlock by 2020.

As of 2010, public transportation in Jakarta served only 56% of commuter trips. This figure urgently needs to be raised, as the city's 9.5% average annual growth rate of vehicles far exceeds the increase in road length between 2005 and 2010.

Until then, public transportation in the city mainly consists of the TransJakarta bus rapid transit system, the KRL Commuterline commuter rail, and various types of independent buses; starting from the very small bemo and pickup-truck sized mikrolet, to slightly larger minibuses such as the widely used MetroMini and Kopaja minibuses and full sized city buses. There are also both two and four wheeled taxis.

Funding

Phase 1 
Phase 1 of the project was funded through a soft loan (Rp16 trillion) (US$1.2 billion) from the Japan International Cooperation Agency (JICA) with a 30 years tenure and 0.25% interest per annum. The loan number IP is 536 (signed November 2006) for engineering services. The engineering services loan is a pre-construction loan to prepare the construction phase. It consists of:
Basic Design package, managed by the DGR (Directorate General of Railways, Ministry of Transport)
Management and Operation package, managed by the Bappeda (Jakarta Regional Planning Board)
Construction assistance in tender, managed by the PT MRT Jakarta

Phase 2 
Phase 2 was funded through a similar loan scheme with a 40 years tenure, allowing a 10 years grace period. The first stage of phase 2 funding (Rp9.4 trillion) incurred 0.1% interest per annumn. Phase 2A funding (Rp25 trillion) will cover a portion of phase 1 excess expenditure (Rp2.5 trillion).

On 24 August 2022, it was announced that cost required for Phase 2A has been ajdusted to Rp26 trillion (US$1.7 billion), up from Rp22.5 trillion. The challenging soil conditions were cited as the reason for the increase.

Phase 3 
Phase 3 will be funded by a Japanese investor, in January 2023 it was announced that cost required for Phase 3 is Rp160 trillion (US$10.6 billion).

The Phase 3 will connected from Balaraja to Cikarang.

Phase 4 
Phase 4 will be funded by a South Korean consortium led by Korea Overseas Infrastructure and Urban Development Corporation with estimates cost Rp28 trillion (US$1.9 billion).

System Network 

The following table lists the MRT lines that are currently operational, under construction or planned as of May 2022. Planned lines are preliminary and could still be altered before entering construction phase.

North–South line

Phase 1
Phase 1 connects Lebak Bulus to Bundaran HI along  and consists of 13 stations (7 elevated stations and 6 underground stations). The Indonesian Ministry of Transport approved this plan in September 2010 and invited tenders. Construction began in October 2013.

Phase 1 was opened for free service on 24 March 2019. Commercial service began on 1 April 2019. Phase 1 is expected to serve 212,000 passengers per day. This expected capacity may be maxed out to 960,000 per day. The  distance is covered in under 30 minutes. Within its first month of operations, 82,000 passengers used the line daily.

Phase 2
Phase 2 was initially planned to extend Bundaran HI to Kampung Bandan in North Jakarta. However, land acquisition issues hindered the process, prompting the administration to find an alternative location, which will also be designed to house the train depot.

On 1 January 2019, the president director of MRT Jakarta, William Sabandar said the city administration had decided to make Kota the final station for Phase 2. The extension was then renamed to Phase 2A.

The extension was initially planned to be fully operational by March 2026. However, due to problems securing bidders for the construction and the effects of the COVID-19 pandemic, the extension is now targeted to be fully operational by 2028.

On 20 February 2019, it was announced that the Red line will be extended further, towards Ancol. The extension was named Phase 2B.

On 17 February 2020, during the signing of contract CP201 for the construction of the first two stations of the Phase 2A extension, the administration announced that Phase 2B will consist of two stations and one depot, and was under feasibility studies, with its construction expected to commence in mid-2022. It has since been delayed. Phase 2B is estimated to cost Rp10 trillion.

Phase 2A construction started on 22 March 2021. During excavation works for the construction of Phase 2A, the remains of tracks used for Jakarta's tramway were found.

East–West line (planned)

A second line is planned to run East–West from Cikarang (West Java) to Balaraja (Banten) via Central Jakarta.
Just like the North-South line, the East-West line will also be built in phases. The line is planned to interchange with the North-South line at Thamrin Station. It is currently under architectural design studies and construction was initially expected to begin in 2020, however it has since been delayed and is now targeted to begin in 2024.

Phase 3A
Phase 3A will be further divided into stage 1 along 24.527 kilometers which will go through Tomang, Dukuh Atas, Senen, Perintis to Medan Satria and stage 2 along 9.237 kilometers through Tomang and Kembangan.

Phase 3B
Meanwhile, MRT East-West phase 3B will be divided into East-West Banten along 29,900 kilometers which will go through Kembangan, Kelapa Dua, to Balaraja, and East-West West Java along 20,438 kilometers which will go through Medan Satria and Cikarang.

Outer–Ring Line (planned)

Phase 4 was first brought up in 2020. It will be a separate line connecting Fatmawati to Taman Mini Indonesia Indah. On 30 June 2022, MRT Jakarta announced that pre-feasibility and feasibility studies have completed and construction is expected to commence in 2023.

Fares and ticketing 

The charged fare for a trip on the MRT starts at Rp3,000, increasing by Rp1,000 for every station passed. A trip spanning the entire existing line in 2019 would cost a passenger Rp14,000.

A refundable Rp15,000 deposit is required to purchase a single journey ticket, in addition to fares required for the journey.

The Jakarta MRT employs a cashless fare payment system. A dedicated contactless smart card known as the 'Jelajah' can be purchased from the ticketing machines or ticket offices located at every station. Other accepted forms of payment include electronic prepaid cards such as the Jak Lingko, E-Money, Brizzi, BNI Tap Cash, Flazz, KAI Commuter Multi Trip Card.

Passengers are required to tap their cards at the fare gates when entering and exiting the paid area of the stations.

In addition to payment cards, MRT Jakarta also accepts payment from electronic wallet providers, such as Gopay, OVO, Dana, LinkAja and Astrapay. Users of electronic wallets must connect their wallet with an app provided by MRT Jakarta (MRT-J) and buy single trip tickets in the form of QR codes.

Safety and security 

To prevent track incursions, half-height and full-height platform screen doors (PSDs) are installed at platforms of elevated and underground stations respectively.

Trains and stations are equipped with CCTVs, which are monitored from the control room. Medical rooms are also available at every station to provide first-aid to passengers and workers, if necessary. Security officers are regularly stationed at station entrances and platforms.

Every stations are equipped with security X-ray machines and walk through metal detectors for passengers entering the MRT system.

Rolling stock 

Contract CP 108 for the procurement of rolling stock for the Jakarta MRT was awarded to a consortium led by Sumitomo Corporation on 3 March 2015. A total of 16 six-cars trainsets were ordered at a cost of ¥10.8 billion (Rp145 billion). The trains were built in Nippon Sharyo's plant in Toyokawa, Aichi.

These trains utilize the CBTC signaling system and are equipped with Automatic Train Operation (ATO) GoA 2, with drivers operating the doors and driving in case of emergency. Like the KRL Commuterline, the MRT trains are also powered via overhead catenary.

MRT Jakarta officially call the trains Ratanggas (singular Ratangga), a nickname first bestowed on 10 January 2018 by then Governor of Jakarta, Anies Baswedan. The name was derived from the old Javanese word for chariots. It offers a women-only carriage during morning peak hours from 7AM to 9AM and in the afternoon from 5PM to 7PM.

PT Mass Rapid Transit Jakarta
PT Mass Rapid Transit Jakarta (Perseroda) is a municipally owned perseroan terbatas founded by the Government of Special Capital Region of Jakarta to operate the Jakarta MRT system. Its establishment was approved by the provincial parliament (DPRD) on 10 June 2008 and the company's incorporation was formally notarized on 17 June 2008. Due to a two-shareholder minimum in Indonesia's perseroan terbaras laws (rescinded for municipally owned corporations in 2020), only 99.98% of the shares are owned by the Government of Jakarta; the rest 0.02% is owned by Perumda Pasar Jaya (a municipal public corporation of Jakarta operating marketplaces). Therefore, PT MRT Jakarta (Perseroda) is the first operating railway company in Indonesia that is not wholly or partly owned by state-owned company Kereta Api Indonesia, and one of the only such companies besides PT LRT Jakarta.

Network Map

See also
 Greater Jakarta Commuter Rail
 Jakarta LRT
 Greater Jakarta LRT
 TransJakarta
 Transport in Jakarta

Notes

References

External links
 MRTJakarta – PT Mass Rapid Transit Jakarta official website

Jakarta MRT
Rapid transit in Indonesia
Transport in Jakarta
Rail infrastructure in Indonesia
Railway companies of Indonesia
Regionally-owned companies of Indonesia
2019 establishments in Indonesia
Standard gauge railways in Indonesia